Lillian-Yvonne Bertram is an American poet known for their work on poetry and digital storytelling.

Education and career 
Bertram holds a PhD in Literature & Creative Writing from the creative writing program at the University of Utah, in addition to degrees from Carnegie Mellon University and the University of Illinois at Urbana-Champaign. Bertram is an associate professor at the University of Massachusetts Boston.

Writings 
Bertram is known for their work on poetry, African-American poetry, poetics, digital storytelling, digital and computational poetics, media arts, and pedagogy. Their first book, But a Storm is Blowing From Paradise is a series of poems that make note of mental and physical landscapes that portray the connection with body, space, time, and love.

Bertram has published other books including Personal Science, a work that explores some occurrences that can result from obsessive thinking. In April 2016, a slice from the cake made of air, was published and it processes the physical and mental trauma of abortions, as well as sexual desire and contemporary culture. Published on December 1, 2019, Travesty Generator consists of poetry generated using an open-source coding and presents how the black experience has become homogenized, branded, and codified for the dissemination by capitalism.

Selected publications

Awards and honors 
In 2011, Bertram received the Benjamin Saltman Poetry Award for their book But a Storm Is Blowing from Paradise. Bertram was the 2015 recipient of a National Endowment for the Arts Creative Writing Poetry Fellowship, and the 2017 recipient of the Harvard University Woodberry Poetry Room Creative Grant. In 2020 Bertram received the Anna Rabinowitz Prize for Travesty Generator, which was also a nominee for the National Book Award for Poetry.

References 

University of Utah alumni
University of Illinois Urbana-Champaign alumni
Carnegie Mellon University alumni
University of Massachusetts Boston faculty
Living people
American women poets
Year of birth missing (living people)